This is a list of diplomatic missions of Denmark. Kingdom of Denmark as a sovereign state consists of three countries incorporated in to the unity of the Realm (Denmark (proper), Greenland, Faroe Islands) and maintains 68 embassies abroad. 

In countries without Danish representation, Danish citizens can seek assistance from public officials in the foreign services of any of the other Nordic countries, in accordance with the Helsinki Treaty.

Africa

 Algiers (Embassy)

 Ouagadougou (Embassy)

 Cairo (Embassy)

 Addis Ababa (Embassy)

 Accra (Embassy)

 Nairobi (Embassy)

 Bamako (Embassy)

 Rabat (Embassy)

 Abuja (Embassy)
 Lagos (Consulate-General)

 Pretoria (Embassy)

 Dar es Salaam (Embassy) (to be closed in 2024)

 Kampala (Embassy)

Americas

 Brasília (Embassy)
 São Paulo (Consulate General)

 Ottawa (Embassy)
 Toronto (Consulate General)

 Santiago (Embassy)

 Bogotá (Embassy)

 Mexico City (Embassy)

Washington, D.C. (Embassy, Representative Office:  Greenland)
 Chicago (Consulate General)
Houston (Consulate General)
New York (Consulate General)
Palo Alto (Consulate General & Silicon Valley Innovation Centre)

Asia

 Dhaka (Embassy)

 Beijing (Embassy)
 Chongqing (Consulate General)
 Guangzhou (Consulate General)
 Shanghai (Consulate General)

 New Delhi (Embassy)

 Jakarta (Embassy)

 Tehran (Embassy)

 Tel Aviv (Embassy)

 Tokyo (Embassy)

 Beirut (Embassy)

 Yangon (Embassy)

 Islamabad (Embassy)

 Ramallah (Representative Office)

 Manila (Embassy)

 Riyadh (Embassy)

 Singapore (Embassy)

 Seoul (Embassy)

Taipei (Trade Council of Denmark, Taipei)

 Bangkok (Embassy)

 Ankara (Embassy)
 Istanbul (Consulate General)

 Abu Dhabi (Embassy)

 Hanoi (Embassy)

Europe

 Vienna (Embassy)

 Brussels (Embassy, Representative Office:  Faroe Islands,  Greenland)

 Sofia (Embassy)

 Zagreb (Embassy)

 Prague (Embassy)

 Tallinn (Embassy)

 Helsinki (Embassy)

 Paris (Embassy)

 Berlin (Embassy)
 Flensburg (Consulate General)
 Hamburg (Consulate General)
 Munich (Consulate General)

 Athens (Embassy)

 Budapest (Embassy)

 Reykjavík (Embassy, Representative Office:  Faroe Islands,  Greenland)

 Dublin (Embassy)

 Rome (Embassy)

 Riga (Embassy)

 Vilnius (Embassy)

 The Hague (Embassy)

 Oslo (Embassy)

 Warsaw (Embassy)

 Lisbon (Embassy)

 Bucharest (Embassy)

 Moscow (Embassy, Representative Office:  Faroe Islands)

 Belgrade (Embassy)

 Madrid (Embassy)

 Stockholm (Embassy)

 Kyiv (Embassy)

 London (Embassy, Representative Office:  Faroe Islands)

Oceania

Canberra (Embassy)
Sydney (Consulate General)

Multilateral organizations
Council of Europe (Strasbourg)
 (Brussels)
 (Brussels)
Organisation for Economic Co-operation and Development (Paris)
Organization for Security and Co-operation in Europe (Vienna)
International Atomic Energy Agency (Vienna)
Comprehensive Nuclear-Test-Ban Treaty Organization (Vienna)

New York 
Geneva
Vienna

Gallery

Cross-accreditation embassies
Resident in Riyadh:

Resident in Abu Dhabi:
 
 
 

Resident in New Delhi:
 
 

Resident in Washington, D.C.:

Resident in other cities:

See also

Foreign relations of Denmark
 Foreign relations of the Faroe Islands
 Foreign relations of Greenland
 List of diplomatic missions of the Nordic countries

References

 
Diplomatic missions
Denmark